The following is a list of the monastic houses in Devon, England.

See also
 List of monastic houses in England

Notes

References
Citations

Bibliography
 Binns, Alison (1989) Studies in the History of Medieval Religion 1: Dedications of Monastic Houses in England and Wales 1066–1216, Boydell
 Cobbett, William (1868) List of Abbeys, Priories, Nunneries, Hospitals, And Other Religious Foundations in England and Wales and in Ireland, Confiscated, Seized On, or Alienated by the Protestant "Reformation" Sovereigns and Parliaments
 Knowles, David & Hadcock, R. Neville (1971) Medieval Religious Houses England & Wales. Longman
 Morris, Richard (1979) Cathedrals and Abbeys of England and Wales, J. M. Dent & Sons Ltd.
 Thorold, Henry (1986) Collins Guide to Cathedrals, Abbeys and Priories of England and Wales, Collins
 Thorold, Henry (1993) Collins Guide to the Ruined Abbeys of England, Wales and Scotland, Collins
 Wright, Geoffrey N., (2004) Discovering Abbeys and Priories, Shire Publications Ltd.
 English Cathedrals and Abbeys, Illustrated, Odhams Press Ltd.
 Map of Monastic Britain, South Sheet, Ordnance Survey, 2nd edition, 1954

Further reading
 Oliver, George (1846) Monasticon Dioecesis Exoniensis: being a collection of records and instruments illustrating the ancient conventual, collegiate, and eleemosynary foundations, in the Counties of Cornwall and Devon, with historical notices, and a supplement, comprising a list of the dedications of churches in the Diocese, an amended edition of the taxation of Pope Nicholas, and an abstract of the Chantry Rolls [with supplement and index]. Exeter: P. A. Hannaford, 1846, 1854, 1889

Devon
Lists of buildings and structures in Devon
Devon
Lists of listed buildings in Devon